Land of Fighting Men is a 1938 American Western film directed by Alan James and written by Joseph O'Donnell. The film stars Jack Randall, Bruce Bennett, Louise Stanley, Dick Jones, Walt Shrum and Bob Burns. The film was released on March 11, 1938, by Monogram Pictures.

Plot
Cowboy Jack Lambert is accused of murdering a rancher, now in order to prove his innocence he has to find the real killer.

Cast           
Jack Randall as Jack Lambert
Bruce Bennett as Fred Mitchell 
Louise Stanley as Connie Mitchell
Dick Jones as Jimmy Mitchell
Walt Shrum as Walt
Bob Burns as Sheriff
Wheeler Oakman as Wallace
John Merton as Flint
Lane Chandler as Cliff 
Rex Lease as Ed 
Ernie Adams as Slim

References

External links
 

1938 films
American Western (genre) films
1938 Western (genre) films
Monogram Pictures films
Films directed by Alan James
American black-and-white films
1930s English-language films
1930s American films